Elvira Kivi (born 19 September 1987) is a visually impaired Swedish judoka.

References

1987 births
Living people
Swedish female judoka
Paralympic judoka of Sweden
Judoka at the 2008 Summer Paralympics
20th-century Swedish women
21st-century Swedish women